Maggie Coles-Lyster (born 12 February 1999) is a Canadian professional racing cyclist, who currently rides for Zaaf Cycling Team.

Coles-Lyster competed at the 2017–18 UCI Track Cycling World Cup where she won a bronze medal in the team pursuit. She also competed at the 2018 Pan American Track Cycling Championships, where she won a bronze medal in the team pursuit event, and at the 2019 Pan American Games where she won silver medals in the team pursuit, and madison events. In 2022 she won gold in the Canadian National Road Race Championships.

In 2020, she came forward with allegations of sexual assault which occurred at a race in the Netherlands in 2017. A formal investigation has been opened by the cycling governing body, the Union Cycliste Internationale.

References

External links 
 

1999 births
Living people
Canadian female cyclists
Cyclists at the 2019 Pan American Games
Pan American Games medalists in cycling
Pan American Games silver medalists for Canada
People from Maple Ridge, British Columbia
Medalists at the 2019 Pan American Games
Cyclists at the 2022 Commonwealth Games
Commonwealth Games competitors for Canada
Medallists at the 2022 Commonwealth Games
Commonwealth Games bronze medallists for Canada
Commonwealth Games medallists in cycling